Park Glacier is located on the northeast slopes of Mount Baker in the North Cascades of the U.S. state of Washington. In the middle of its course, Park Glacier is connected to Rainbow Glacier to the north and Boulder Glacier to the south.

See also 
List of glaciers in the United States

References 

Glaciers of Mount Baker
Glaciers of Washington (state)